Clarence Napier Bruce, 3rd Baron Aberdare, GBE (2 August 1885 – 4 October 1957), styled The Honourable from 1895 to 1929, was a British military officer, cricketer, tennis player, and also an excellent golfer. He was the second son of Henry Bruce, 2nd Baron Aberdare.

Bruce received his education at Twyford School, Winchester College and at New College, Oxford, and was admitted as a barrister of the Inner Temple; however, when World War I broke out, he decided to enter the British Army. His elder brother was killed in action in 1914, making him heir apparent to his father's barony.

Lord Aberdare, who would rise to the substantive rank of captain (and would become an honorary colonel) in World War I, served variously in the Glamorgan Yeomanry, the 2nd Life Guards, the headquarters of the 61st (2nd South Midland) Division and in the Guards Machine Gun Regiment; in 1919, immediately after the armistice, he was promoted to captain. He inherited the barony in 1929. He served as the honorary colonel of the 77 (later 282) (Welsh) Heavy AA Brigade, RA from 1930 to 1952; during this period, he additionally served as major of the 11th Battalion, Surrey Home Guards during World War II. Between the two world wars, he was an active real tennis player. Bruce was U.S.A. Amateur Champion in 1930 and of the British Isles in 1932 and 1938. He played eighteen times for Great Britain in the Bathurst Cup and six times won the Coupe de Paris. He carried off the M.C.C. Gold Prize on five occasions and nine times won the Silver Prize.

In 1937, Aberdare was appointed chairman of the National Fitness Council, the first attempt at a Sports Council in England. It quickly established 22 area committees to help with its aim of promoting a fit population. It was funded by the Department of Education and provided capital grants for new facilities and other grants to help with the appointment of trainers and leaders. It had a difficult two years before being dissolved in October 1939. These included liaison with existing statutory and voluntary organisations. In absorbing the Juvenile Organisations Committee and its local committees it alienated many who had worked towards bridging the gap between recreation provided at school and to the wider community (14–20 age group). In addition there was much support for compulsory physical training as opposed to the council's approach of a voluntary ethos.

Simultaneously, Aberdare played an active role in the organisation of the Olympics; he served on the International Olympic Committee, and on the organising committee of the 1948 Summer Olympics in London. He was a key player in the decision to send British athletes to Hitler's 1936 Olympics, asserting that "neither nor his colleagues 'had yet heard of a genuine case of an Olympic athlete being boycotted or impeded because of his non-Aryan origin'", this despite Nazi Germany's overtly stated anti-semitism. He served in many physical education and sportsmen's clubs, and was also be a member of the New College Society. In 1948, he was created a Knight of the Order of St John of Jerusalem, and a Commander of the Order of the British Empire a year later. In 1954, he was additionally created a Knight Grand Cross of the Order of the British Empire.

Aberdare's first wife, née Margaret Bethune Black, died on 8 February 1950. On 12 September 1957 Aberdare married his second wife, the actress Griselda Hervey. The couple drove to attend the 53rd Session of the IOC in Sofia, held from 23 to 28 September. After the IOC meeting finished, Aberdare and Griselda began driving home through Yugoslavia as part of their honeymoon. On 4 October 1957 their car left the road near Risan and fell into the sea. Aberdare, aged 72, drowned and Griselda, his wife, aged 56, was injured. The repatriation of Lord Aberdare's body was arranged by Sir John Lambert at the UK embassy in Belgrade: as coffins were not permitted on passenger flights, Lambert concealed Aberdare's body among the cellos of the Minneapolis Symphony Orchestra.

References

External reading
Ed. Charles Mosley. Burke's Peerage, Baronetage and Knightage. Copyright 2003; Burke's Peerage and Gentry: Wilmington, Delaware.
 

1885 births
1957 deaths
Alumni of New College, Oxford
People educated at Twyford School
British Army personnel of World War I
British Home Guard officers
British Life Guards officers
Deaths by drowning
English cricketers
English male tennis players
Knights Grand Cross of the Order of the British Empire
Members of the Inner Temple
Middlesex cricketers
People educated at Winchester College
Road incident deaths in Yugoslavia
International Olympic Committee members
British sports executives and administrators
Knights of Grace of the Order of St John
Oxford University cricketers
Gentlemen cricketers
Wales cricketers
Harlequins cricketers
Gentlemen of England cricketers
Glamorgan Yeomanry officers
British male tennis players
Younger sons of barons
20th-century British businesspeople
Clarence